The Party Album (stylized as The Party Album!) is the international reissue of Dutch dance group Vengaboys', debut studio album, Up & Down - The Party Album.

Content
Two new singles were released from The Party Album: "Boom, Boom, Boom, Boom!!" and "We're Going to Ibiza". Three of the band's four previously released singles, "To Brazil!", "Up & Down" and "We Like to Party! (The Vengabus)", are included on the album as the singles of this album. We're Going to Ibiza is cited as their sixth and final single of this album. The album tracks "You and Me" and "The Vengabeat", a reworked version of a previously recorded song "Funky Speed", both appeared on their previous album, Up & Down - The Party Album. Greatest Hits Part 1 features the same songs as the standard edition, except that it omits "Vengababes from Outer Space" and has five additional songs.

Track listings

2013 bonus track
 "Vengaboys MegaMix 2010" - 7:15

Bonus VCD
Released in 1999 through Central Station (CSRCD5105) in Australia, and included as a bonus VCD.
 "Boom, Boom, Boom, Boom!!"
 "Up & Down"
 "We Like to Party (The Vengabus)"
 "To Brazil!"
 "Parada de Tettas"

Charts

Weekly charts

Year-end charts

Certifications and sales

References

1999 debut albums
Vengaboys albums